Vinko Šapina (born 29 June 1995) is a German professional footballer who plays as a midfielder for  club SC Verl.

Career
Born in Ulm, Šapina played youth football for TV Wiblingen, SSV Ulm 1846 and VfB Stuttgart before starting his senior career at FC Memmingen in 2014. After a trial with Hallescher FC in May 2016, he signed for SSV Ulm 1846 in summer 2016. After 12 goals in 106 appearances for Ulm, Šapina joined SC Verl on a two-year contract in summer 2021.

References

External links

1995 births
Living people
German footballers
German people of Croatian descent
Sportspeople from Ulm
Footballers from Baden-Württemberg
Association football midfielders
SSV Ulm 1846 players
VfB Stuttgart players
FC Memmingen players
SC Verl players
3. Liga players
Regionalliga players